Lucius Cassius Longinus was the brother of the Gaius Cassius Longinus, a leading instigator in the assassination of Julius Caesar.

Around 52 BC, Lucius was triumvir monetalis in 63 BC. He minted denarii referring to the famous trial of the vestal virgins of 114–113 BC, which was prosecuted by his ancestor Lucius Cassius Longinus Ravilla. He was a proconsul by Caesar's appointment in 48 BC, during the civil war. He occupied Thessaly, but was forced by Metellus Scipio to retreat, after which he joined Calvisius Sabinus in Aetolia. He was a tribune of the plebs in 44 BC, a year in which the people's tribunes were exceptionally numerous and his brother held the praetorship. Along with his fellow tribunes Tiberius Canutius and Decimus Carfulenus, L. Cassius was excluded from the important meeting of the Roman senate held November 28 to reassign several provinces for the following year. A bill enabling Caesar to add new families to the patriciate was probably sponsored by him rather than his brother as praetor.

References

Bibliography 

 Michael Crawford, Roman Republican Coinage, Cambridge University Press, 1974.

1st-century BC Romans
Ancient Roman generals
Longinus, Lucius